Neerdie is a rural locality split between the Gympie Region and the Fraser Coast Region, both in Queensland, Australia.

History 
Originally Neerdie was within the Shire of Tiaro and then later within the Shire of Cooloola. In the local government amalgamations of 2008, Neerdie became split between Gympie Region and Fraser Coast Region.

References 

Gympie Region
Fraser Coast Region
Localities in Queensland